Coccotrema is a genus of lichen-forming fungi. It is the type genus of the family Coccotremataceae, in the order Pertusariales. The genus contains 16 species.

Taxonomy
Coccotrema was circumscribed by Swiss botanist Johannes Müller Argoviensis in 1889, with Coccotrema antarcticum assigned as the type species.

In a 2001 publication, Schmidt and colleagues showed, using molecular phylogenetics, that the species then known as Lepolichen coccophorus (the type species of the genus Lepolichen, created by Trevisan in 1853) was nested in a clade that contained Coccotrema species, and so transferred that species into Coccotrema, as Coccotrema coccophorum. However, the genus Lepolichen is older than Coccotrema, and so its name has priority according to the rules for botanical nomenclature. To minimize nomenclatural disruption, Alan Fryday and colleagues submitted a proposal to conserve the name Coccotrema against Lepolichen.

Species
Coccotrema antarcticum 
Coccotrema citrinescens  – Europe
Coccotrema coccophorum 
Coccotrema colobinum 
Coccotrema corallinum  – South America
Coccotrema cucurbitula 
Coccotrema fernandezianum  – South America
Coccotrema hahriae  – Alaska
Coccotrema magellanicum  – South America
Coccotrema maritimum  – North America
Coccotrema minutum 
Coccotrema pocillarium 
Coccotrema porinopsis 
Coccotrema rubromarginatum  – Falkland Islands
Coccotrema sphaerophorum

References

Pertusariales
Pertusariales genera
Lichen genera
Taxa described in 1889
Taxa named by Johannes Müller Argoviensis